Videndum plc is a manufacturer of hardware and software for the film industry founded in 1910 and based in Richmond, London. It is listed on the London Stock Exchange and is a constituent of the FTSE 250 Index.

History
The business was established by William Vinten when he started manufacturing Kinemacolor projectors for Charles Urban in 1909. The company, trading as 'W. Vinten Cinematograph Engineers', was formed in 1910 and was originally based at 89-91 Wardour Street, London.

In 1914, the company workshops were taken over by the government and William Vinten was invited by Sopwith at Kingston upon Thames to work alongside them in their aeroplane factory. This led in 1915 to an invitation by the Royal Flying Corps for William Vinten to design and build the Model B, a special cine-camera for use in aircraft.

In 1928 the company expanded and moved to Cricklewood, North London, mainly supplying the film industry by creating specialised equipment for companies such as Kodak.

The Second World War created an increased requirement for reconnaissance cameras and the company secured military contracts which gave it world market presence for reconnaissance work.

In the late 1940s, the broadcast market began to flourish and the company developed the first telerecording camera. As a result the British Broadcasting Corporation became increasingly involved with Vinten. The BBC became the world benchmark for whom Vinten adapted many of their original film camera supports creating equipment more suitable for television cameras.

In 1964 Vinten moved to Bury St Edmunds in Suffolk. In 1972, the company was floated on the London Stock Exchange.

In the early 1980s, the company worked in partnership with the BBC to develop pedestals, tripods and other equipment for use in their news studios.

In 1988 Vinten split into two separate entities, W Vinten Ltd (which became Thales Optronics), focused solely on reconnaissance equipment, and Vinten Broadcast, focussed on broadcast mounting equipment.

From 1989 the company began a series of acquisitions: Manfrotto (1989), Bexel (1991), Gitzo (1992), Bogen Imaging (1993), TSM Inc [known for its AutoCam product range] (1993), Sachtler (1995), OConnor (2003).

Vinten Group plc changed its name to Vitec Group plc in 1995.

Following the acquisition of Radamec in 2003 a new brand Vinten Radamec was created to take over the manufacture of robotic camera support products.

In April 2021, Vitec acquired Quasar Science, a linear LED tube manufacturer.

In May 2022, the company changed its name to Videndum plc. Vinten continues to exist as one of the group's brands.

Operations
The company's main brands include:

Anton/Bauer
Gitzo
Litepanels
Manfrotto
Quasar Science
Sachtler
SmallHD
Teradek
Vinten

References

Further reading
 The Vinten Story (German) Fernsehmuseum Wiesbaden
 

Aircraft component manufacturers of the United Kingdom
Manufacturing companies of the United Kingdom
Companies based in Suffolk